Teiu may refer to:

Romania
Teiu, Argeș, a commune in Argeș County
Teiu, a village in Horea Commune, Alba County
Teiu, a village in Orodel Commune, Dolj County
Teiu, a village in Lăpugiu de Jos Commune, Hunedoara County
Teiu, a village in Galicea Commune, Vâlcea County
Teiul, a village in Amărăști Commune, Vâlcea County

Moldova
Teiu, Transnistria, a commune in Transnistria